Hypotrix purpurigera is a moth of the family Noctuidae. It is found in Brazil. It is the type species of the genus Hypotrix.

References

External links
Noctuídeos (Lepidoptera, Noctuidae) coletados em quatro Áreas Estaduais de Conservação do Rio Grande do Sul, Brasil

Hypotrix
Moths described in 1852